Aegialia arenaria, the dune scarab beetle, is a species of beetle in the family Scarabaeidae. It is found in the Palearctic
and Nearctic. It is a coastal species found on sand dunes of western and northern Europe (Netherlands, Belgium, France (Nord-Pas-de-Calais), Germany, Denmark, Portugal, Spain, Britain, Ireland, Norway, Sweden, Finland) and in the Nearctic from Nova Scotia in Canada (Sable Island), to Massachusetts and New Hampshire.

References

Scarabaeidae
Beetles described in 1787